The men's 5000 metres at the 2017 Asian Athletics Championships was held on 6 July.

Results

References
Results

5000
5000 metres at the Asian Athletics Championships